Severe Tropical Cyclone Alby was regarded as the most devastating tropical cyclone to impact southwestern Western Australia on record. Forming out of an area of low pressure on 27 March 1978, Alby steadily developed as it tracked southwestward, parallel to Western Australia. Between 1 and 2 April, the storm quickly intensified and attained its peak intensity as a Category 5 cyclone on the Australian cyclone intensity scale. After turning to the southeast, the storm underwent an extratropical transition as it neared Cape Leeuwin. The storm brushed the cape on 4 April, bringing hurricane-force winds, before rapidly losing its identity the following day.

In Western Australia, the combination of Alby's fast movement and hurricane-force winds caused widespread damage. Along the coast, large swells flooded low-lying areas and numerous homes lost their roofs from high winds. Further inland, bushfires were worsened by the storm as it brought little rain, generally less than  along the coast. These fires burned roughly 114,000 hectares (281,700 acres) and destroyed two towns. Five fatalities are attributed to Alby and the associated brushfires. The resulting damage was extensive, with monetary losses reaching A$50 million (US$45 million).

Meteorological history

At this time, the system was characterised as a large cluster of convection converging around the low. Notable development took place over the following three days as the system drifted towards the southwest. Convection began wrapping around the storm, forming banding features. Early on 29 March, the Joint Typhoon Warning Center (JTWC), classified the system as a tropical storm. Shortly thereafter, the Bureau of Meteorology in Perth classified it as a tropical cyclone, assigning it with the name Alby. By then, a large ragged eye developed and Alby steadily intensified through 2 April. At the end of this strengthening, Cyclone Alby attained its peak intensity as a Category 5 on the Australian cyclone intensity scale; a barometric pressure of 930 mbar (hPa) was measured at the time and peak winds were estimated to be  based on the Dvorak technique.

Shortly after reaching this intensity, Alby slowed as it began turning towards the southeast. This rapid acceleration was due to the cyclone's interaction with a cold front to its south. Gradually weakening, Alby also underwent an extratropical transition as the storm's structure became asymmetrical. Around 1300 UTC on 4 April, the storm passed within  of Cape Leeuwin as an extratropical storm. By 5 April, the cyclone rapidly lost its identity as it became caught up in a northwesterly flow before merging with the cold front over the Great Australian Bight.

Impact and aftermath
The highest winds reached  in Albany. The intense winds, considered unprecedented for many in the region, were attributed to the fast movement of the storm and its location in relation to land. It also allowed for winds to cover a large area northeast of the centre, impacting many areas far from the storm.

These winds resulted in widespread agricultural, environmental and structural damage. Hundreds of structures sustained severe damage, mostly consisting of roofs blowing off. The most severe losses took place in Albany where most homes had partial or complete roof failure. Air-borne debris also damaged buildings during the storm. Nearly 80% of the apple crop was lost in the Donnybrook–Manjimup area. A total of 154,400 m3 (5.4 million ft3) of timber was lost as well as a potential 200,000 m3 (7 million ft3) of future growth on established trees. Widespread dust storms also ruined crops and removed topsoil from many areas. Near the coast, the combined effects of strong, onshore winds and little rain led to significant inland sea spray. Numerous power lines and stations failed during the storm due to winds as well as dust and salt accretion. Large portions of the South-West Land Division were without electricity due to Cyclone Alby; Perth nearly sustained a complete breakdown of power services. This led to secondary losses attributable to the storm such as production failure. One person died in Toodyay after falling off his roof while trying to repair it. Newspapers connected the death of one person in a vehicle accident in Pemberton to the storm; however, the Bureau of Meteorology does not attribute it to Alby.

The large expanse of gale-force winds without precipitation exacerbated 92 ongoing brush fires in the region. A total of 114,000 hectares (281,700 acres) of land was burned throughout Western Australia as a result of the fires. Within this area, more than 10,000 sheep and 500 cattle and horses were killed. Over 100 structures,  of fencing and tens of thousands of hay bales were destroyed. According to newspaper reports, the towns of Jarrahwood and Yornup were leveled by the wildfires. At least 50 individual fires were fanned by the storm across the region, prompting more than 1,000 firefighters to assist in putting them out. Containment efforts were successful after six days, with the fires put under control by 10 April. Two people were killed while trying to suppress the fires: one from a fallen tree in Mount Barker and the other in Manjiump when a bulldozer clearing a firebreak flipped over.

Along the coast, large swells produced by the storm resulted in two fatalities in Albany Harbour as well as significant coastal damage. Tides across the region were expected to increase. Unexpectedly, all forecast values were exceeded by at least . This led to significant coastal flooding that damaged dozens of structures, including Busselton Jetty. In Bunbury, water breached the sea wall, inundating 100 homes and prompting the evacuation of 130 residents. Throughout Western Australia, Cyclone Alby was responsible for five fatalities and A$50 million (US$45 million) in damage. There was also severe beach erosion associated with the storm, with some areas losing  of land. Due to the extensive damage, the name Alby was retired from the list of Western Australian cyclone names following its usage.

In the wake of Cyclone Alby, an appeal for relief in the affected region was made by The Lord Mayor's Distress Relief Fund. The unprecedented scale of damage prompted meteorologists to vastly improve forecasting in the region to be better prepared for a similar storm in the future. At the time, little to no warning was given to residents in the South-West Land Division; this was the result of Alby's abrupt acceleration along a cold front, a complex forecasting situation. It was also regarded as a "wake up call" for the region, reminding residents that they are not immune to the effects of tropical cyclones. Cyclone Alby has been used as a benchmark to compare future storms in the region to, such as Severe Tropical Cyclone Bianca in 2011.

See also

List of cyclones in Western Australia
List of retired Australian cyclone names

References

Notes

External links

Alby 1978
Alby
Alby
Cyclone Alby
Cyclone Alby
1970s in Perth, Western Australia